Iñigo Barrenetxea García (born 10 January 1994) is a Spanish footballer who plays as an attacking midfielder.

Club career
Born in Bilbao, Biscay, Basque Country, Barrenetxea joined Athletic Bilbao's youth setup in 2004. Released in 2006, he finished his graduation with Danok Bat CF and subsequently returned to Athletic in the 2013 summer, being assigned to the farm team CD Basconia in Tercera División.

On 8 June 2015 Barrenetxea was released by the Lions, and subsequently joined SD Eibar's reserve team CD Vitoria, but spent the whole pre-season with the main squad. He made his first team – and La Liga – debut on 7 November, coming on as a late substitute for Gonzalo Escalante in a 3–1 home win against Getafe CF.

On 8 August 2016, Barrenetxea was loaned to Segunda División B side Sestao River Club, in a season-long deal. Upon returning he left the Armeros, and signed for fourth division club Bermeo FT on 18 November 2017.

In December 2017, Barrenetxea moved to fellow fourth division side Zamudio SD. The following 24 August, he joined Lorca FC also in the same category.

References

External links

1994 births
Living people
Spanish footballers
Footballers from Bilbao
Association football midfielders
La Liga players
Segunda División B players
Tercera División players
CD Basconia footballers
CD Vitoria footballers
SD Eibar footballers
Sestao River footballers
Zamudio SD players
Lorca FC players
Athletic Bilbao footballers
Bermeo FT footballers
Águilas FC players